Sandro Araújo da Silva (born May 19, 1974, in Restinga Seca, Rio Grande do Sul), known as Sandro Gaúcho, is a former Brazilian football midfielder.

Club career

Club Career Statistics
Last Update  2 May 2010

External links
 Soccer Terminal Profile

Living people
1974 births
Brazilian footballers
Grêmio Foot-Ball Porto Alegrense players
C.F. Os Belenenses players
Foolad FC players
Sanat Naft Abadan F.C. players
Expatriate footballers in Iran
Association football midfielders